The 1987 German Grand Prix was a Formula One motor race held at the Hockenheimring on 26 July 1987. It was the eighth round of the 1987 Formula One season. It was the 49th German Grand Prix and the eleventh to be held at the Hockenheimring. It was held over 44 laps of the seven kilometre circuit for a race distance of 298.760 km (185.812 mi).

Pre-race
In the week leading up to the German Grand Prix a number of teams tested at the Hockenheim circuit. The rear corner of his Lotus 99T was destroyed and parts were reported to be hard to find as most ended up flying off into the forest. As a result of the crash Goodyear took the precaution of immediately flying in new compound tyres from their plant in Akron in the United States in time for the Grand Prix weekend.

The tyre failure was determined to be the result of Senna picking up a puncture late on his previous lap. However the Lotus' active suspension system compensated for that and kept the car at its correct ride height, masking the problem from Senna. This caused many to question the system as the general belief was that with a passively suspended car Senna would have known he had a puncture and would not have continued to drive at high speed.

Race
The race was won by eventual 1987 World Champion, Nelson Piquet driving a Williams FW11B. It was his first win of the season and his third win in the German Grand Prix having previously won for Brabham in 1981, and Williams in the previous year. Piquet won by over a minute and a half from Swedish driver Stefan Johansson driving a McLaren MP4/3, who coasted over the finish line on three wheels due to a tyre puncture suffered just past the pits on his last lap. The Swede's second place was the 50th podium finish for the Porsche-designed TAG turbo engine. Piquet inherited the win after engine failure claimed his team-mate, Briton Nigel Mansell, and reigning champion, Frenchman Alain Prost (McLaren MP4/3). Ayrton Senna finished third in his Lotus 99T.

Just seven cars were classified at the end of the race, as the long straights took their toll on engine reliability. Naturally aspirated cars finished as high as fourth place with Frenchman Philippe Streiff leading home a team one-two in the Jim Clark/Colin Chapman Trophy standings for Tyrrell as Jonathan Palmer finished in fifth place. In sixth was French driver Philippe Alliot driving a Lola LC87 for the new Larrousse team. It was Alliot's second top six finish in Formula One and Larrousse's first world championship point, although the Constructor's Championship point would be credited to the chassis designers, Lola Cars.

Piquet's win vaulted him into the championship lead for the first time in 1987, putting him four points ahead of Senna and nine ahead of Mansell.

Classification

Qualifying

Race 

Numbers in brackets refer to positions of normally aspirated entrants competing for the Jim Clark Trophy.

Championship standings after the race

Drivers' Championship standings

Constructors' Championship standings

Jim Clark Trophy standings

Colin Chapman Trophy standings

 Note: Only the top five positions are included for all four sets of standings.

References

German Grand Prix
German Grand Prix
German Grand Prix
German Grand Prix